Óscar Pujol Muñoz (born 16 October 1983) is a Spanish former professional cyclist, who rode professionally between 2009 and 2018, including as a member of UCI ProTeams  and .

In July 2018, Pujol became the first presenter for the Spanish-language Global Cycling Network channel.

Major results

2006
2nd Overall Vuelta a Cantabria
3rd Overall 
1st Stages 1 & 4
2007
1st 
1st Stage 4 Vuelta Ciclista a Navarra
1st Stage 2 Bizkaiko Bira
2nd 
3rd 
2008
7th Clásica a los Puertos de Guadarrama
2012
1st Overall Tour de Singkarak
1st Points classification
1st Mountains classification
1st Stage 3
1st Melas CX Basin Racin'
2nd Overall Banyuwangi Tour de Ijen
6th Overall Tour of Iran
2013
6th Overall Tour de Singkarak
1st Stage 1
2014
1st  Mountains classification Tour de Kumano
8th Overall Tour de Singkarak
1st Stage 5
2015
1st Ibukiyama Driveway Hill Climb
1st Ishikawa Road Race
1st Miyada Hillclimb
2016
1st Overall Tour of Japan
1st Stage 6
1st Overall Tour de Kumano
1st Stage 2
1st Taiwan KOM Challenge
5th Japan Cup
2017
1st Overall Tour of Japan
1st Stage 6
2nd Overall Tour de Kumano
2nd Taiwan KOM Challenge
5th Klasika Primavera
9th Overall Tour of Hainan

Grand Tour general classification results timeline

References

External links

 Cervélo TestTeam profile
 
 

1983 births
Living people
Spanish male cyclists
Sportspeople from Terrassa
Cyclists from Catalonia
21st-century Spanish people